The Xinpongnaobao Formation is a geological formation in Inner Mongolia, China whose strata date back to the Early Cretaceous. Dinosaur remains are among the fossils that have been recovered from the formation.

Vertebrate paleofauna
 Psittacosaurus osborni

See also

 List of dinosaur-bearing rock formations

References

Geologic formations of China
Lower Cretaceous Series of Asia